The Palawan moss shrew (Palawanosorex muscorum) is a species of shrew found on Mount Mantalingajan in the Philippines. The shrew is one of two other unique species only found on Mount Mantalingajan.

See also 

 Palawan shrew

References 

White-toothed shrews
Mammals described in 2018